The 1980 Ohio State Buckeyes football team was an American football team that represented Ohio State University during the 1980 Big Ten Conference football season. In their second season under head coach Earle Bruce, the Buckeyes began the season ranked No. 1 in the pre-season AP Poll.  They finished in a tie for second place in the Big Ten Conference (Big Ten), compiled a 9–3 (7–1 against Big Ten opponents), lost to Penn State in the 1980 Fiesta Bowl, were ranked No. 15 in the final AP Poll, and outscored all opponents by a combined total of 387 to 181. The team played its home games at Ohio Stadium in Columbus, Ohio.

The team's statistical leaders included quarterback Art Schlichter with 1,930 passing yards, running back Calvin Murray with 1,267 rushing yards, wide receiver Doug Donley with 887 receiving yards, and placekicker Vlade Janakievski with 90 points scored. Several Ohio State players also ranked among the Big Ten leaders in various statistical categories, including the following:
 Calvin Murray led the Big Ten with 1,267 rushing yards, 1,471 yards from scrimmage, and 6.5 yards per rushing attempt. 
 Vlade Janakievski led the Big Ten with 90 points scored and 45 extra points made, and ranked second with 15 field goals made and a 68.2 field goal percentage.
 Doug Donley led the Big Ten with 20.6 yard per reception and ranked fifth with 887 receiving yards. 
 Art Schlichter ranked second in the Big Ten with a 139.7 passing efficiency rating, 8.5 yards per pass attempt, and 22 total touchdowns, and third with 1,930 passing yards, a 54.0 pass completion percentage, and 2,255 total yards.
 Tim Spencer ranked fourth in the Big Ten with 5.3 yards per rushing attempt and eight rushing touchdowns.

Schedule

Roster

Depth chart

Coaching staff
 Earle Bruce – Head Coach – 2nd year
 Dennis Fryzel – Defensive Coordinator (2nd year)
 Glen Mason – Offensive Coordinator (3rd year)
 Bill Myles – Offensive Line (4th year)
 Nick Saban – Defensive Backs (1st year)
 Wayne Stanley – Running Backs (2nd year)
 Steve Szabo – Defensive Line (2nd year)
 Bob Tucker – Defensive Outside Linebackers (2nd year)
 Fred Zechman – Quarterbacks/Receivers (2nd year)

Game summaries

Syracuse

On September 13, Ohio State (AP No. 1) opened its season with a 31–21 victory over Syracuse at Ohio Stadium in Columbus. Despite being a 27-point underdog, Syracuse led, 21–9, at halftime. Ohio State's quarterback and Heisman Trophy candidate, Art Schlichter, threw two interceptions in the first half, and then led the Buckeyes to a 22-point comeback in the second half. After the close game with Syracuse, Ohio State dropped to No. 2 in the AP Poll as Alabama took over the No. 1 spot.

Minnesota

On September 20, Ohio State (AP No. 2) easily defeated Minnesota, 47–0, before the largest crowd (87,916) in Ohio Stadium history. Ohio State led, 33–0, at halftime in the one-sided contest. Minnesota running back Garry White fumbled twice, and quarterback Tim Salem threw three interceptions to help the Buckeyes' cause.  After the game, Ohio State remained ranked No. 2 in the AP Poll.

Arizona State

Source: Palm Beach Post
    
    
    
    
    
    
    
    
    

On September 27, Ohio State (AP No. 2) defeated Arizona State (AP No. 20), 38–21, before a crowd of 88,097 at Ohio Stadium in Columbus, Ohio. Art Schlichter accounted for 310 yards of total offense, including 271 passing yards and three touchdown passes. Doug Donley caught six passes for 133 yard and two touchdowns. Ohio State totaled 591 yards of total offense, and Arizona State had 440 yards.

UCLA

On October 4, Ohio State (AP No. 2) was shut out by UCLA (AP No. 11), 17–0. UCLA held Ohio State scoreless for the first time in the Buckeyes' last 25 games. Ohio State fell to No. 9 in the following week's AP Poll.

at Northwestern

On October 11, Ohio State defeated Northwestern, 63–0, before a homecoming crowd of 29,375 at Dyche Stadium in Evanston. Ohio State led, 42-0, at halftime. Ohio State had 575 total yards, including 418 rushing yards. Calvin Murray had 120 yards and three touchdowns on nine carries. The night before the game, Northwestern coach was served with a lawsuit filed by 22 African American players alleging racial discrimination.

Indiana

On October 18, Ohio State (AP No. 9) defeated Indiana, 27–17, in Columbus. Ohio State running back Calvin Murray rushed for 224 yards, the fourth highest single-game tally in Ohio State history to that time, on 35 carries and scored two touchdowns on his 22nd birthday. Mike Harkrader rushed for 117 yards on 18 carries for the Hoosiers. Harkrader became the seventh leading rusher in Big Ten history with 3,034 yards.

Wisconsin

On October 25, Ohio State (AP No. 10) defeated Wisconsin, 21–0, in Madison. Wisconsin's defense held Art Schlichter to 89 passing yards, but Ohio State scored touchdowns after two Wisconsin fumbles and an interception. After the game, Wisconsin coach Dave McClain said, "You can't make that many mistakes. I've never been so frustrated with the mistakes."

at Michigan State

On November 1, Ohio State (AP No. 9) defeated Michigan State, 48–16, in front of a crowd of 77,153 persons at Spartan Stadium in East Lansing. Ohio State tallied 603 total yards in the game, and the Buckeyes' 48 points was the most allowed by Michigan State since 1976.

Illinois

On November 8, Ohio State (AP No. 7) narrowly defeated Illinois, 49–42, in Columbus. Illinois quarterback Dave Wilson set an NCAA single-season record with 621 passing yards. Art Schlichter threw four touchdown passes and broke the Ohio State career total yards record previously held by Archie Griffin.

at Iowa

On November 15, Ohio State easily defeated Iowa, 41–7, in Iowa City. Art Schlichter threw two touchdown passes, and Calvin Murray rushed for 183 yards to lead the Buckeyes.

Michigan

On November 22, Ohio State (AP No. 5) and Michigan (AP No. 10) met in their annual rivalry game to determine the Big Ten championship. The game was played before a record crowd of 88,827 fans at Ohio Stadium and matched the conference's top scoring offense (Ohio State) against the top scoring defense (Michigan).  Michigan prevailed, defeating the Buckeyes by a 9–3 score. Michigan's only touchdown came late in the third quarter on a pass from John Wangler to Anthony Carter. Ali Haji-Sheikh missed the extra point and also missed two field goal attempts. Big Ten rushing leader Calvin Murray was held to 38 yards on 14 carries. Ohio State had a chance to win late in the fourth quarter, as Art Schlichter completed a 28-yard pass to the Michigan 32-yard line with less than a minute to play. Schlichter was penalized for intentional grounding and was sacked on the next play with 13 seconds left on the clock. Michigan extended its streak of not having allowed a touchdown to 18 quarters and 274 minutes.

vs. Penn State (Fiesta Bowl)

References

Ohio State
Ohio State Buckeyes football seasons
Ohio State Buckeyes football